The Jefferson County Courthouse is an historic Classical Revival style courthouse building located  in Monticello, Florida. Built in 1909, it was designed by Georgia-born American architect Edward Columbus Hosford, who is noted for the  courthouses and other buildings that he designed in Florida, Georgia and Texas. The builder was Mutual Construction Company of Louisville, Kentucky whose bid for the project was $39,412.

It was modeled on President Thomas Jefferson’s famous house, Monticello, for which the town is named.

The motto, Suum Cuique, Latin for To each his own, which is inscribed over the doors of the courthouse, is jokingly pronounced Sue ‘em quick by some local residents.

The building is a contributing property in the Monticello Historic District, which was added to the National Register of Historic Places on August 19, 1977

See also
 Jefferson County Courthouse (disambiguation)

References

External links

  Historic Monticello/Jefferson County
 Florida's Historic Courthouses

County courthouses in Florida
Edward Columbus Hosford buildings
Neoclassical architecture in Florida
Buildings and structures in Jefferson County, Florida
Clock towers in Florida
Historic district contributing properties in Florida
Monticello, Florida
National Register of Historic Places in Jefferson County, Florida
1909 establishments in Florida
Government buildings completed in 1909